Riker is an American crime drama television series that aired from March 14 until April 11, 1981.

Premise
A cop is forced to quit after a scandal and takes a job for the Attorney general's office.

Cast
Josh Taylor as Frank Riker
Michael Shannon as Brice Landis

Episodes

References

External links
 

1981 American television series debuts
1981 American television series endings
1980s American crime drama television series
English-language television shows
CBS original programming
Television shows set in Los Angeles
Television series by Sony Pictures Television